CICN-FM was a radio station broadcasting First Nations community radio programming on the frequency 104.3 MHz (FM) on the Muskeg Lake Cree Nation at Marcelin, Saskatchewan, Canada.

History
On June 22, 2011, Muskeg Lake Cree Nation Radio Station Corporation received Canadian Radio-television and Telecommunications Commission (CRTC) approval to operate a new English- and Cree-language low-power Type B Native FM radio station at Muskeg Lake Cree Nation, Saskatchewan. The station signed on the air on November 1, 2011 and ceased broadcasting in June 2017.

References

External links
www.muskeglake.com
Cicn Radio 104.3 Muskeg Lake - Facebook
 

ICN
Radio stations established in 2011
2011 establishments in Saskatchewan
Radio stations disestablished in 2017
2017 disestablishments in Saskatchewan
ICN-FM